Sir Reginald Charles Wright (10 July 190510 March 1990) was an Australian barrister and politician. He was a member of the Liberal Party and served as a Senator for Tasmania from 1950 to 1978. He held ministerial office in the Gorton and McMahon Governments, although he was known for crossing the floor.

Early life 
Wright was born in Central Castra, Tasmania in 1905. He was educated at Devonport High School and the University of Tasmania, where he earned a Bachelor of Arts and a Bachelor of Laws.

Career 

Wright was admitted to the bar in 1928 and lectured in law at the University of Tasmania. In 1941, he enlisted in the second Australian Imperial Force and was promoted to captain in 1943.

Wright was elected as a Liberal member for the Tasmanian House of Assembly seat of Franklin in November 1946 and was the first State president of the Liberal Party in Tasmania. In November 1949, he resigned to enter federal politics. He was elected to the Senate at the 1949 election, taking his seat in February 1950. He was appointed to the ministry in February 1968 in the John Gorton government as Minister for Works and Minister in charge of Tourist Activities. He held these positions in the McMahon government, which was defeated at the 1972 election.

Wright holds the record in the Australian Parliament for "crossing the floor" to vote against his own party, which he did 150 times. He did not contest the 1977 election. He was knighted on 3 June 1978, for his services to the Tasmanian Parliament. He left the Liberal Party in June 1978 and sat as an independent until his retirement on 30 June.

Later life

An accomplished barrister and orator, Wright returned to practising law on retiring from the Senate in 1978. In retirement he returned to a farm near the farmhouse in Castra where he had been born and died there; he was accorded a State Funeral in Ulverstone, Tasmania.

His younger brother, Emeritus Professor Sir Douglas Wright AK was Chancellor of the University of Melbourne. He predeceased Reg by only ten days. His older brother, John Forsyth Wright was a Member of the House of Assembly in the Parliament of Tasmania.

Two of Sir Reginald's sons achieved distinction in the law. His youngest son, Philip Wright (1945-2021) was a magistrate in Hobart, while eldest son Christopher AO is a Queen's Counsel, former Solicitor-General of Tasmania, former judge of the Supreme Court of Tasmania, former deputy president of the Administrative Appeals Tribunal and former head of Tasmania's Police Review Board.

References

1905 births
1990 deaths
Liberal Party of Australia members of the Parliament of Australia
Members of the Australian Senate for Tasmania
Members of the Australian Senate
Members of the Tasmanian House of Assembly
Australian barristers
Australian solicitors
Australian Knights Bachelor
Australian politicians awarded knighthoods
University of Tasmania alumni
Independent members of the Parliament of Australia
20th-century Australian politicians
Australian Army personnel of World War II
Australian Army officers